John Norreys may refer to:
Sir John Norris (soldier) or Norreys (c. 1547–1597), the son of Henry Norris, 1st Baron Norreys, a lifelong friend of Queen Elizabeth
Sir John Norreys (Keeper of the Wardrobe) for Henry VI of England (c. 1400–1466)
Sir John Norreys (Usher of the Chamber) (c. 1481–1564), English courtier
Sir John Norreys (high sheriff) (died 1612), High Sheriff of Berkshire and Member of Parliament for Windsor, 1597–1601

See also
 John Norris (disambiguation)